Torre Archirafi is a frazione of the comune (municipality) of Riposto in the Catania area of southern Italy.

History
The name comes from Torre di Archirafi or the Archirafi Tower, a coastal watchtower, built to repel Barbary corsairs in the 16th century and later destroyed by the sea sometime in the 17th century. The town itself was ceded to the Duke of Archirafi, Giovanni Natoli Ruffo, by King Charles III of Bourbon in the 17th century.

Places of interest
The inhabited area has kept the old historic public center fairly intact which includes the Palazzo Vigo (formerly known as Palazzo Natoli or Palazzo dei Principi Natoli) a palace built in the 17th century by Giovanni Natoli Ruffo,  Duke of Archirafi. Today, the palace is primarily used for art exhibitions, conferences, and lectures.

References

Frazioni of the Province of Catania
Riposto